Westphalen is a German surname. It may refer to:

People
 Ferdinand von Westphalen (1799–1876), German politician
 Jenny von Westphalen, wife of German philosopher Karl Marx
 Judith Westphalen, Peruvian painter
 Karl von Westphalen, German politician
 Ludwig von Westphalen, liberal German government official
 Marc Westphalen, German sprint canoer
 Otto Westphalen, German naval officer

Fictional

 Kristin Westphalen, character in SeaQuest DSV

Places

 Frederico Westphalen, city in Brazil
 Roman Catholic Diocese of Frederico Westphalen
 Westphalia or Westfalia is a region in Germany.

Science

 Westphalen-Lettré rearrangement